The White Rose of the Wilds is a 1911 American short silent drama film directed by D. W. Griffith and starring Blanche Sweet.

Cast
 Blanche Sweet as White Rose
 Robert Harron as White Rose's Brother
 W. Chrystie Miller as White Rose's Father
 Wilfred Lucas as First Outlaw
 Joseph Graybill as Second Outlaw
 Donald Crisp
 Mack Sennett

See also
 D. W. Griffith filmography
 Blanche Sweet filmography

References

External links

1911 films
Biograph Company films
American black-and-white films
1911 drama films
1911 short films
Films directed by D. W. Griffith
American silent short films
Silent American drama films
Films with screenplays by Frank E. Woods
1910s American films
1910s English-language films
American drama short films